Frank Habineza is Rwandan politician founder and chairman of the Democratic Green Party of Rwanda, a political party formed in August 2009 in Rwanda.
In its first year, the party made six unsuccessful attempts to register.
As of mid-August 2010 the party was still not registered, and therefore was unable to submit a candidate for the August 2010 Presidential elections.
In September 2018, Frank Habineza and one other member of the Democratic Green Party of Rwanda were elected into Parliament. They are the first Opposition candidates to win seats in the Rwandan parliament since Kagame's Rwanda Patriotic Front (RPF) came to power after the 1994 genocide.

Background

Habineza was born in Mityana, Uganda in a Rwandese family on 22 February 1977.
He attended the National University of Rwanda from 1999 to 2004, graduating in Political and Administrative Sciences with a major in Public Administration. While at University he started a student association campaigning for environment protection.
In 2005, he became a personal assistant to the Minister of Lands, Environment, Water, Forestry and Mines. He was the official correspondent of Rwanda Newsline and UMUSESO while he was a student in Butare. He also worked for the former Rwanda Herald Newspaper, whose publisher Asuman Bisika was declared 'persona non-grata' in mid-2002.

Habineza was for three years (2006–2009), National Coordinator for the Nile Basin Discourse Forum in Rwanda (NBDF), a civil society platform that had over 50 NGOs involved in the conservation of river Nile. He resigned in May 2009. He was also President of the Rwanda NGOs Forum on Water, Sanitation and Environment-RWASEF and founder chairman for the Rwandan Environment Conservation Organisation (RECOR). He resigned from all the NGOs when he joined active opposition politics.
In June 2010 these two organizations distanced themselves from him after a report alleged that donor funds had been diverted for political purposes.
The report, issued by the Ministry of Local Government, named Habineza as one of the people behind "briefcase" NGO's that fleece donors, and named five NGOs as vehicles used by him to obtain funding for political activities.

Political career

Habineza founded the Democratic Green Party (DGPR) in August 2009 as an alternative to the dominant Rwanda Patriotic Front.
In April 2010 three leading members of the DGPR resigned due to disagreements over Habineza's activities. They said that the party was being manipulated by foreigners, and denied statements made by Habineza that Rwanda was helping the UK and the US plunder timber from the Democratic Republic of Congo (DRC) and that Rwanda had deployed troops in the DRC.
In July 2010 the vice-president of the DGPR, Andre Kagwa Rwisereka, was found dead near a wetland in Butare with his head cut off.
He had been repeatedly stabbed.
Habineza was among opposition leaders who called for an independent international investigation into the murder, which may have had a political motivation.

References

Living people
1977 births
Democratic Green Party of Rwanda politicians
Political party founders
National University of Rwanda alumni
Candidates for President of Rwanda